Epyaxa subidaria, the subidaria moth, is a moth of the family Geometridae. The species was first described by Achille Guenée in 1857 and it is native to Australia, including Tasmania.

References

Xanthorhoini
Moths described in 1857